Toroidh was a martial music project by Swedish musician Henrik Nordvargr Björkk (of industrial band Maschinenzimmer 412 fame).  Bjorkk has described it as a continuation of Folkstorm, his previous project. In 2015 the project continued.

Releases 
 For The Fallen Ones (Eternal Soul Records, 7") 
 Europe Is Dead (Cold Spring, 2001, CD)
 Those Who Do Not Remember The Past Are Condemned To Repeat It (205 Recordings, 2001, CD & LP)
 Enter Nordvargr, one track on compilation (Old Europa Cafe, 2002, 2xCD) 
 Start Over (Neuropa Records, 2003, 2x7")
 Testament (205 Recordings, 2003, CD)
 Chamber, one track on compilation (Cold Spring, 2003, CD)
 United in Blood (together with Arditi) (Neuropa Records, 2004, CD)
 A Final Testimony, one track on compilation (Seküencias De Culto, 2004, 2xCD) 
 Offensiv! (Eternal Soul Records, 2004, CD)
 European Trilogy (War Office Propaganda, 2006, 3-CD boxset)
 The Final Testament (Eternal Pride Productions, 2006, CD)
 Segervittring (Neuropa Records, 2007, CD)

References

External links 
 Official Toroidh website
 Interview with Toroidh by PN
 Toroidh entry at Discogs

Swedish industrial music groups